Bebelis fasciata is a species of beetle in the family Cerambycidae. It was described by Fisher in 1947.

References

Bebelis
Beetles described in 1947